The Clockwork Prologue  is the seventh studio album by the English progressive rock band Gandalf's Fist. Released on 1 July 2019, it is a two disc spanning rock-opera interspersed with a professionally acted radio play between the actual songs. The album is a two-part "Expansion Pack" to their previous album, The Clockwork Fable, featuring an expanded set of the original cast and performers, and providing more characters and storylines alongside the original story.

Reception

Sea of Tranquility Steven Reid wrote "[...] none of this would matter if the music wasn’t up to snuff, but whether encountering the languid surge of "The Waxwork Downs", the grandiose Uriah Heep meets Iron Maiden styled "Leader of Men", the more Saracen-like "Wardens" or the glorious folk prog workout that is "Supplies for the Festivities", there's not a cog that isn't turning perfectly."

The Progressive Aspect Tony Colvill writes "[...] Every now and then the lunatics have an away day from the asylum; the Gandalf's Fist collective are such a bunch of lunatics. The Prologue is really a tale within a tale, that fits somewhere, though where is a complete mystery to me. [...] In adding to the Cogtopolis storyline, it builds a little flesh on the original story, and what was an epic listen evolves into a saga.  [...] The album fits as a tale within; overacting barkingly joyously wonderful. Gandalf's Fist have delivered again. It completes the Fable, and I really look forward to the next tale, even if the subject may change. [...]"

Track listing
All songs written and composed by Dean Marsh.

The Cast 
The cast list is taken from the liner notes, with further background to the characters they play also available.

The Orchestra
Dean Marsh – 6 and 12 String Electric Guitars, Synths, Mandolin, Octave Mandola, Bass
Ben Bell - Piano, Hammond Organ, Synths, Fretless Bass, Nashville Guitar
Stefan Hepe –  Drums, Percussion
Christopher Ewen – Bass Guitar
Luke Severn – Tubular Bells, Goose Flute
with
William Stewart - Violins

The Choir
Keri Farish - sung words of "The Clokkemaker" and her all-seeing spyglasses.
Dean Marsh - sung words of "The Good People of Cogtopolis"
Luke Severn - sung words of "The Nightkeepers"
Ben Bell - the Choir of Doom
with
Melissa Hollick - sung words of "Eve"

Voice Actors
Mark Benton - as "King Dahks/City Announcer/City Official and distant expulsions of the Lamplighter"
Tim Munro - as "The Tinker"
Alicia Marsh - as "Eve"
Bill Fellows - as "Dirty Doyle/Irontooth/Nightkeeper Spy"
Paul Kavanagh - as "The Primarch"
Keri Farish - as "The Clokkemaker/Washer Ethel"
Christopher Ewen - as "The Boy"
Ben Bell - as "the deranged Steam-Conveyor"
Rafferty Marsh - as "an urchin at the weasel pie stall"
with
You, The Listener - as "The Traveler"

References

2019 albums
Gandalf's Fist albums